The Ghana Journalists Association (GJA) is the umbrella organization to which all journalists in Ghana belong. The current president is Mr Albert Kwabena Dwumfour.

Founded in 1949, the Ghana Journalists Association (GJA) has become the umbrella organization representing Ghanaian journalists. It is registered as a professional association and listed as one of several bodies on the board of the National Media Commission.

In its activities GJA tends to achieve higher professional standards, to promote and defend press freedom and to create solidarity among Ghanaian journalists and with other journalists both in Ghana and abroad.

To realize these objectives GJA organizes educational programmes, workshops, seminars and lectures on issues relevant to media development and growth.

In May 2021, the GJA, Ghana Independent Broadcasters Association and the Private Newspaper Printers Association of Ghana urged the National Security to apologize to the management of Citi FM and Citi TV due to the alleged assault and maltreatment of Caleb Kudah and the invasion of the media house.

Ghana Journalists Association Code of Ethics 

The GJA Code of Ethics was adopted by the National Council of the Ghana Journalists Association at Sunyani on 27 July 1994. It was drawn up as a ready guide and is applicable to members of the association in the state-owned media, private media and local freelance journalists.

The code provides a frame of reference to the National Executive and the Disciplinary Committee and members of the association when it becomes necessary to initiate disciplinary action against any member who flouts any Article of the Code.

The code is meant to ensure that members adhere to the highest ethical standards, professional competence and good behaviour in carrying out their duties.

As the fourth estate of the realm, the public expect the media to play their watchdog role. They should do this with a high sense of responsibility without infringing the rights of individuals and the society in general.

Articles
ARTICLE 1: PEOPLE'S RIGHT TO TRUE INFORMATION

The duty of every journalist is to write and report the truth, bearing in mind his/her duty to serve the public.
The public have the right to unbiased, accurate, balanced and comprehensive information as well as express themselves freely through the media.
A journalist should make adequate enquiries and cross-check his/her facts.

ARTICLE 2: SOCIAL RESPONSIBILITY

In collecting and disseminating information, the journalist should bear in mind his/her responsibility to the public at large and the various interests in society.

ARTICLE 3: PROFESSIONAL INTEGRITY

Journalists should not accept bribe or any form of inducement to influence the performance of his/her professional duties.

ARTICLE 4: PLAGIARISM

A journalist should not plagiarise because it is unethical and illegal. Where there is the need to use another's material, it is proper to credit the source.

ARTICLE 5: RESPECT FOR PRIVACY AND HUMAN DIGNITY

Journalists should respect the right of the individual, the privacy and human dignity.
Enquiries and intrusions into a person's private life can only be justified when done in public interest.
A journalist should guard against defamation, libel, slander and obscenity.

ARTICLE 6: RESPECT FOR NATIONAL AND ETHNIC VALUES

A journalist should not originate material that encourages discrimination on the grounds of ethnicity, colour, creed, gender or sexual orientation.

ARTICLE 7: CONFIDENTIAL SOURCES

Journalists are bound to protect confidential sources of information.

ARTICLE 8: SUPPRESSION OF NEWS
Under no circumstances should news or a publication be suppressed unless it borders on national security or it is in public interest to do so.

ARTICLE 9: CORRECTIONS

Whenever there is an inaccurate or a misleading report, it should be corrected promptly and given due prominence. An apology should be published whenever appropriate.

ARTICLE 10: REJOINDERS

A fair opportunity should be given to individuals and organisations.
Any report or a write-up affecting the reputation of an individual or an organisation without a chance to reply is unfair and must be avoided by journalists.

ARTICLE 11: SEPARATING COMMENTS FROM FACTS

While free to take positions on any journalists should draw a clear line between comment, conjecture and fact.

ARTICLE 12: INFORMATION AND PICTURES

A journalist shall obtain information, photographs and illustration only by straightforward, means.
The use of other means can be justified only by overriding considerations of the public interest.
The journalist is entitled to exercise a personal conscientious objection to the use of such means.

ARTICLE 13: RESPECTING EMBARGOES

Journalists should respect embargoes on stories.

ARTICLE 14: VICTIMS OF SEXUAL ASSAULT

Journalists should avoid identifying victims of sexual assault.

ARTICLE 15: DEALING WITH THE UNDER-AGED
Journalists should protect the rights of minors and in criminal and other cases secure the consent of parents or guardians before interviewing or photographing them.

ARTICLE 16: PERSONAL GRIEF OR DISTRESS

In case of personal grief or distress, journalists should exercise tact and diplomacy in seeking information and publishing.

ARTICLE 17: HEADLINES & SENSATIONALISM

Newspaper headlines should be fully warranted by the contents of the articles they accompany.
Photographs and telecasts should give an accurate picture of an event and not highlight an incident out of context.

Notable people
Georgina Ama Ankumah, broadcast journalist, news presenter with GBC as the Ashanti Regional Correspondent
Maltiti Sayida Sadick, journalist, media personality and news achor
Nana Aba Anamoah, General Manager of GHOne TV and Starr 103.5 FM
Della Russel Ocloo, reporter at Graphic Communications Limited in the Tema Municipality.
Diana Ngon, Northern Regional correspondent of Citi News
Eunice Akoto Attakora-Manu, broadcast journalist, news presenter with Pure FM
Alice Aryeetey, broadcast journalist and news reporter who currently works with GHOne TV.
Auguster Asantewa Boateng, broadcast journalist
Vivian Kai Lokko, media personality, journalist and business anchor at Citi FM
Dzifa Bampoh, journalist, communications and media personality, Senior Editor at 3Fm and TV3
Audrey Gadzekpo, media practitioner

References

External links
 Ghana Journalists Association website

Professional associations based in Ghana
Journalism-related professional associations